Gaspard André (16 March 1840 in Lyon - 12 February 1896 in Cannes) was a French architect, best known as the designer of the Theater of the Place des Célestins, the Fountain of the Place des Jacobins and the Grand Temple de Lyon in Lyon, the city hall of Neuilly-sur-Seine and the Palace of Rumine in Lausanne.

Notes

References
Aynard, Édouard, L'œuvre de Gaspard André, Lyon : A. Storck, 1898. 
Bruyère, Gérard and Chiron, Noëlle, Gaspard André : architecte lyonnais, 1840-1896, Lyon : Archives Municipales, 1996.

External links

The works of Gaspard Andre, Kyoto University Library.

1840 births
1896 deaths
19th-century French architects
Architects from Lyon